The Sauvie Island Bridge crosses the Multnomah Channel of the Willamette River near Portland, Oregon, United States. The original Parker truss bridge, built in 1950 with a  main span, was replaced with a tied arch bridge with a  span in 2008 due to cracks discovered in 2001.

In November 2022, the Multnomah County Board of Commissioners voted to rename the bridge (to a yet-to-be-determined name) in honor of the Native Americans that originally lived on Sauvie Island.

Old bridge
Opened on December 30, 1950, the first bridge to Sauvie Island replaced the Sauvie Island Ferry. The $900,000 bridge was designed by the Oregon Department of Transportation and built by Gilpin Construction. Oregon transferred ownership to Multnomah County in 1951. The approach spans were built of reinforced concrete girders.

New bridge

After cracks were found in the 1950 span in 2001, Multnomah County restricted weight and speed on the bridge. Early designs for a new bridge were submitted in July 2004, and groundbreaking was held on January 4, 2006. The new $38 million span was designed by H2L2 Architecture with David Evans & Associates as the design engineers, and built by Max J. Kuney Company. The main span is of a tied arch design constructed of steel, while the approach spans are a box-girder style using pre-stressed concrete. The bridge has two lanes of traffic with shoulders and sidewalks on both sides for a total width of 66 feet. The bridge was floated into place after it was constructed.

In March 2006, then-city commissioner Sam Adams proposed reusing the Sauvie Island bridge span as a bicycle/pedestrian bridge over Interstate 405 in downtown Portland, as part of the Burnside/Couch Transportation and Urban Design Plan.  A coalition of Portland community groups including the Pearl District Neighborhood Association and the Bicycle Transportation Alliance supported the idea. Adams ultimately retracted the proposal, realizing the cost would likely be more than the $5.5 million he had originally stated.

The $43 million new bridge opened June 23, 2008. The old bridge was removed in August 2008 and was scrapped at Schnitzer Steel Industries.

See also
 List of crossings of the Willamette River

References

External links

 Sauvie Island Bridge page on Multnomah County website
 Special Coverage of the Flanders Street Bridge Project - BikePortland.org

Bridges over the Willamette River
Bridges completed in 1950
Tied arch bridges in the United States
Bridges completed in 2008
Sauvie Island
Road bridges in Oregon
2008 establishments in Oregon
1950 establishments in Oregon
Steel bridges in the United States
Bridges in Multnomah County, Oregon